The Drei Türme (also Dri Türm or Drei Drusentürme; "three towers") are a group of peaks in the Rätikon range of the Alps, located on the border between Austria and Switzerland. The highest of the three, the Grosser Turm, lies on the Austrian side of the border, in the state of Vorarlberg. It is the highest point of the Drusenfluh group.

References

External links
Drei Türme on Hikr

Mountains of the Alps
Mountains of Vorarlberg
Mountains partially in Switzerland